This is a list of known ancient Egyptian towns and cities. The list is for sites intended for permanent settlement and does not include fortresses and other locations of intermittent habitation. Use Ctrl + F and enter the town's name or alternative name for convenience.

Lower Egypt

Upper Egypt

Nubia

Red Sea Coast

See also
 Nome

References

 List
Towns and cities
 List
Egypt